Timothy McCarthy is a former Boston City Councilor who represented District 5 (Mattapan, Hyde Park, and Roslindale). The Democrat began his term in 2013.  In January 2019, he announced that he would not be running for re-election.

Biography
McCarthy graduated from Catholic Memorial High School, Curry College and the Harvard Business School Program for Management Development. He attended Tufts University for a year before transferring to Curry’s continuing education program.  He earned a Master’s Degree in public administration at Suffolk University.  He lives in Hyde Park, Boston with his wife, Maureen. They have two sons.

City Council
McCarthy was one of three councilors who voted against the Jim Brooks Stabilization Act.  Ultimately defeated in the State House, it sought "to require landlords to inform tenants of their rights in the case of an eviction, and to notify the city as well."

After the 2019 Straight Pride Parade in Boston, McCarthy proposed a ban on face masks as a public safety measure.

McCarthy opposes legalizing recreational marijuana.

References

Living people
Boston City Council members
People from Hyde Park, Boston
Curry College alumni
Massachusetts Democrats
Suffolk University alumni
Tufts University alumni
Catholic Memorial School alumni
Year of birth missing (living people)